The Sajjāda nashīn (lit. "[one who] sits [at a] prayer mat") or Gaddi nashin is a term of Persian origin, used chiefly within the Sufi traditions of South Asia referring to the successor or hereditary administrator of a Sufi master who typically functions as a custodian or trustee at his shrine.

In some cases, the Sajjada Nashin is the descendant of a Sufi or Pir or a descendant of one of their disciples.  Sajjada means 'prayer mat' (from the Arabic sajdah or 'prostration') while nashin is the word used for the person seated thereon. A Sajjada particularly tends to the shrine which is made over the Sufi's tomb or grave, known as a Dargah or Mazar. A trustee is a key person who holds and leads the traditional Sufi rituals in the Dargah's daily activities and particularly during death anniversaries called Urs. As a hereditary position the role of Sajjada nashin passes onto a child following the death of the holder.

Pakistani politician Shah Mehmood Qureshi was the Sajjada Nashin of the shrine of Sufi saint Hazrat Baha-ud-din Zakariya Multani but was 'dethroned' following claims he was using his position to further his political career.

See also
Silsila
Tariqa
Ziyarat
Khanqah
Sufism

References 

Titles in India
Urs